The United States Revenue Act of 1921 (ch. 136, November 23, 1921) was the first Republican tax reduction following their landslide victory in the 1920 federal elections. New Secretary of the Treasury Andrew Mellon argued that significant tax reduction was necessary in order to spur economic expansion and restore prosperity.

Mellon obtained repeal of the wartime excess profits tax. The top marginal rate on individuals fell from 73 to 58 percent by 1922, and preferential treatment for capital gains was introduced at a rate of 12.5 percent. Mellon had hoped for more significant tax reduction.

Tax on Corporations 
In 1921 a rate of 10 percent was levied on the net income of corporations and 12.5 percent levied thereafter.

Tax on Individuals 
A Normal Tax and a Surtax were levied against the net income of individuals as shown in the following table.

Exemption of $1,000 for single filers and $2,500 for married couples and heads of family. A $400 exemption for each dependent under 18.  Married couple exemption is reduced to $2,000 for net income over $5,000.

References 

1921 in law
United States federal taxation legislation
1921 in the United States